The 2015 season was Sanfrecce Hiroshima's seventh consecutive season in J.League Division 1, and 45th overall in the Japanese top flight. Sanfrecce Hiroshima also competed in the Emperor's Cup, J.League Cup, and the FIFA Club World Cup. The club secured its third J1 League title after beating Gamba Osaka on aggregate on 5 December 2015.

Transfers

In

Out

Players

First team squad
Updated 7 March 2016

Competitions

Overall

Overview

{| class="wikitable" style="text-align: center"
|-
!rowspan=2|Competition
!colspan=8|Record
|-
!
!
!
!
!
!
!
!
|-
| J1 League

|-
| Emperor's Cup

|-
| J.League Cup

|-
| FIFA Club World Cup

|-
! Total

J1 League

First stage

Second stage

Overall placement

Championship stage

Emperor's Cup

J.League Cup

FIFA Club World Cup

References

External links
 Sanfrecce Hiroshima official site
 J. League official site

Sanfrecce Hiroshima
Sanfrecce Hiroshima seasons